Young, Lazy and Driving Us Crazy is an Australian reality television series that premiered on the Seven Network on 20 February 2014. It is based on the British series Young, Dumb and Living Off Mum.

Premise
Ten pampered young adults, who refuse to grow up or leave home and ranging in ages from 18 to 23 must live together in a house and fend for themselves. Each week they must compete in different work challenges, set by their parents, to test various factors of maturity, from teamwork and responsibility to good old fashioned hard work. The parents watch exactly what the kids have been up to and vote out the one who have made the least effort. At the end of the series the one who can cut it in the world of adulthood will take away the prize of a $20,000 trust fund.

Reception
The Sydney Morning Herald called the series "the worst show of 2014". The show debuted to disappointing ratings.

References

External links
 Official website

Seven Network original programming
2014 Australian television series debuts
2010s Australian reality television series
Television series by Matchbox Pictures